Chali (Tanzanian ward) is an administrative ward in the Bahi District of the Dodoma Region of Tanzania.

In 2016 the Tanzania National Bureau of Statistics report there were 12,281 people in the ward, from 11,300 in 2012. The ward has .

References

Wards of Dodoma Region